60th Street  may refer to:

 60th Street (Manhattan), an east–west street in Manhattan, New York City
 60th Street (SEPTA station), an elevated stop on the Market-Frankford Line